Connla Cáem ("the beautiful"), also known as Connla Cruaidchelgach ("bloody blade"), son of Irereo, was, according to medieval Irish legend and historical tradition, a High King of Ireland.

Biography
He came to power after he killed his predecessor, and his father's killer, Fer Corb, and ruled for four (or twenty) years, until he died in Tara, and was succeeded by his son Ailill Caisfiaclach. The Lebor Gabála Érenn synchronises his reign with that of Ptolemy IV Philopator of Egypt (221–205 BC). The chronology of Geoffrey Keating's Foras Feasa ar Éirinn dates his reign to 319–315 BC, the Annals of the Four Masters to 463–443 BC.

See also
Connla the Ruddy
Connla, the son of Cú Chulainn

References

Legendary High Kings of Ireland
4th-century BC rulers
Regicides
Usurpers